USS Fahrion (FFG-22), fourteenth ship of the  of guided-missile frigates, was named for Admiral Frank George Fahrion (1894–1970).

Ordered from Todd Pacific, Seattle, WA on 28 February 1977 as part of the FY77 program, Fahrion was laid down on 1 December 1978, launched on 24 August 1979, and commissioned on 16 January 1982. Transferred to Egypt on 15 March 1998 as ENS Sharm El-Sheik (F901), she was formally decommissioned and stricken on 31 March 1998. , Sharm El-Sheik remained in active service with the Egyptian Navy.

Fahrion (FFG-22) was the first ship of that name in the US Navy.

Operations and Missions
Multinational Peacekeeping Force Beirut Lebanon - Oct. 1983 - March 1984 
Operation Earnest Will -MEF 2–86 
Operation Earnest Will -MEF 2–88 (May 1988 – Sept 1988)
Baltops 89 (June 1989 – Sept 1989)
Great Lakes Cruise (June 1990 – September 1990)
Operation Abel Vigil (June 1994 – August 1994)
UNITAS 36–95 (27 June 1995-December 1995)
Great Lakes Cruise (June 1997 – September 1997)

References

External links
MaritimeQuest USS Fahrion FFG-22 pages
GlobalSecurity.org FFG-22

 

Oliver Hazard Perry-class frigates of the United States Navy
Ships built in Seattle
1979 ships
Cold War frigates and destroyer escorts of the United States
Mubarak-class frigates
Frigates of Egypt